A back-illuminated sensor, also known as backside illumination (BI) sensor, is a type of digital image sensor that uses a novel arrangement of the imaging elements to increase the amount of light captured and thereby improve low-light performance.

The technique was used for some time in specialized roles like low-light security cameras and astronomy sensors, but was complex to build and required further refinement to become widely used. Sony was the first to reduce these problems and their costs sufficiently to introduce a 5-megapixel 1.75 µm BI CMOS sensor at general consumer prices in 2009. BI sensors from OmniVision Technologies have since been used in consumer electronics from other manufacturers as in the HTC EVO 4G Android smartphone, and as a major selling point for the camera in Apple's iPhone 4.

Description
A traditional, front-illuminated digital camera is constructed in a fashion similar to the human eye, with a lens at the front and photodetectors at the back. This traditional orientation of the sensor places the active matrix of the digital camera image sensor—a matrix of individual picture elements—on its front surface and simplifies manufacturing. The matrix and its wiring, however, reflect some of the light, and thus the photocathode layer can only receive the remainder of the incoming light; the reflection reduces the signal that is available to be captured.

A back-illuminated sensor contains the same elements, but arranges the wiring behind the photocathode layer by flipping the silicon wafer during manufacturing and then thinning its reverse side so that light can strike the photocathode layer without passing through the wiring layer. This change can improve the chance of an input photon being captured from about 60% to over 90%, (i.e. a 1/2 stop faster) with the greatest difference realised when pixel size is small, as the light capture area gained in moving the wiring from the top (light incident) to bottom surface (paraphrasing the BSI design) is proportionately smaller for a larger pixel. BSI-CMOS sensors are most advantageous in partial sun and other low light conditions. Placing the wiring behind the light sensors is similar to the difference between a cephalopod eye and a vertebrate eye. Orienting the active matrix transistors behind the photocathode layer can lead to a host of problems, such as crosstalk, which causes image noise, dark current, and color mixing between adjacent pixels. Thinning also makes the silicon wafer more fragile. These problems could be solved through improved manufacturing processes, but only at the cost of lower yields, and consequently higher prices. Despite these issues, early BI sensors found uses in niche roles where their better low-light performance was important. Early uses included industrial sensors, security cameras, microscope cameras and astronomy systems.

Other advantages of a BSI sensor include wider angular response (giving more flexibility for lens design) and possibly faster readout rates. Disadvantages include worse response uniformity.

Industry observers noted that a back-illuminated sensor could theoretically cost less than a similar front-illuminated version. The ability to collect more light meant that a similarly sized sensor array could offer higher resolution without the drop in low-light performance otherwise associated with the megapixel (MP) race. Alternatively, the same resolution and low-light capability could be offered on a smaller chip, lowering costs. Key to attaining these advantages would be an improved process that addressed the yield problems, largely through improving the uniformity of an active layer on the front of the detectors.

A major step in the adoption of BI sensors was made when OmniVision Technologies sampled their first sensors using the technique in 2007. These sensors, however, did not see widespread use due to their high costs. The first widely used BI sensor was the OmniVision OV8810, which was announced on 23 September 2008, and contained 8 megapixels which were 1.4 µm in size. The OV8810 was used in the HTC Droid Incredible and HTC EVO 4G, which were released in April and June 2009, respectively. In June 2009, OmniVision announced the 5MP OV5650, which had the best low-light sensitivity at 1300 mV/lux-sec and the lowest stack height at 6 mm in the industry. Apple selected the OV5650 to use in the back camera of the iPhone 4, which garnered good reviews for its low-light photos.

Sony's work on new photodiode materials and processes allowed them to introduce their first consumer back-illuminated sensor as their CMOS-based "Exmor R" in August 2009. According to Sony, the new material offered +8 dB signaling and −2 dB noise. When combined with the new back-illuminated layout, the sensor improved low-light performance by as much as two times. The iPhone 4s employed an image sensor manufactured by Sony. In 2011, Sony implemented their Exmor R sensor in their flagship smartphone Sony Ericsson Xperia Arc.

In January 2012, Sony developed the back-side illuminated sensor further with Stacked CMOS, where the supporting circuitry is moved below the active pixel section, giving another 30% improvement to light capturing capability. This was commercialized by Sony in August 2012 as Exmor RS with resolutions of 13 and 8 effective megapixels.

In October 2012, GoPro used a Sony IMX117 sensor as the first BSI sensor in their action cameras, in the Hero3 Black.

In September 2014 Samsung announced the world's first APS-C sensor to adopt BSI pixel technology. This 28 MP sensor (S5KVB2) was adopted by their new compact system camera, the NX1, and was showcased along with the camera at Photokina 2014.

In June 2015 Sony announced the first camera employing a back-side illuminated full frame sensor, the α7R II.

In August 2017 Nikon announced that its forthcoming Nikon D850, a full-frame digital SLR camera, would have a back-illuminated sensor on its new 45.7 MP sensor.

In September 2018 Fujifilm announced the availability of the X-T3, a mirrorless interchangeable-lens camera, with a 26.1MP APS-C Fujifilm X-Trans sensor back-illuminated sensor.

In April 2021, Canon announced their new R3 model would feature a 35mm full-frame, back illuminated, stacked CMOS sensor and a DIGIC X image processor.

In April 2021, Ricoh released the Pentax K-3 III featuring a BSI 26 megapixel APS-C sensor from Sony and a PRIME V image processor.

In May 2021, Sony announced a new back-illuminated, stacked sensor for the Micro Four Thirds format.

See also 
 Wafer backgrinding

References

Bibliography

 (Sony), "Sony unveils 'Exmor R' back-illuminated CMOS technology", Sony press release, 6 August 2009
 P.K. Swain and David Cheskis, "Back-Illuminated Image Sensors Come to the Forefront", Photonics, August 2008
 Junko Yoshida, "OmniVision adopts backside illumination technology for CMOS imager", EE Times, 27 May 2007
 (Apple), "iPhone 4: Camera", Apple Inc., 7 June 2010

External links

 List of Hamamatsu Backthinned CCD sensors
 Back thinned CCD used in Security cameras
 Microscopy Primer on Quantum Efficiency
 The Back-Illuminated CCD: Improving Light Sensitivity

Digital cameras
Image sensors